Best Foot Forward is a 1943 American musical film adapted from the 1941 Broadway musical comedy of the same title. The film was released by Metro-Goldwyn-Mayer, directed by Edward Buzzell, and starred Lucille Ball, William Gaxton, Virginia Weidler, Chill Wills, June Allyson, Gloria DeHaven, and Nancy Walker.

The actors did their own singing, except for Lucille Ball, whose singing was dubbed by Gloria Grafton; Virginia Weidler, whose singing was dubbed by Jeanne Darrell; and Jack Jordan, whose singing was dubbed by Ralph Blane.

Weidler, then 16 years old, retired from acting after this film was made, making Best Foot Forward her final screen appearance.

Plot
The story centers around Lucille Ball, who plays herself against the backdrop of a military academy full of frisky boys. Ball is the reluctant guest of a diminutive cadet, Bud Hooper, who wrote her a "mash note" and invitation to be his date at a school prom.

Ball's publicity man, Jack O'Riley, seizes upon the situation as a perfect PR stunt, and convinces her to travel 3,000 miles to join Hooper at Winsocki Military Institute's dance. When Ball actually shows up, mayhem ensues. Hooper, who never dreamed she would accept, has to disinvite his girlfriend, Helen Schlesinger, and ask Ball to pretend to be Helen, lest the actress herself not pass muster with the institution's screening committee.

Helen fights back while Hooper tries to keep Ball from the clutches of other cadets who want to steal her for themselves. Meanwhile, Harry James and his orchestra perform various songs, including "The Flight of the Bumblebee". The cast also sings and dances their way through such numbers as "Buckle Down, Winsocki" (the tune co-opted in the 1960s for "Buckle Up for Safety"), "Wish I May", "Three Men on a Date", "Alive and Kickin'", "The Barrelhouse, the Boogie-Woogie, and the Blues", and "Ev'ry time". (The soundtrack CD also includes the cut "What Do You Think I Am?".)

Cast

Musical numbers
All songs by Ralph Blane and Hugh Martin.
 "Buckle Down, Winsocki" - Sung by Tommy Dix and Chorus behind titles.
 "Wish I May Wish I Might" - Sung and Danced by Gloria DeHaven, June Allyson, Kenny Bowers, Jack Jordan (dubbed by Ralph Blane), Sara Haden, Donald McBride, and Chorus.
 "Three Men on a Date" - Sung by Tommy Dix, Kenny Bowers, and Jack Jordan (dubbed by Ralph Blane).
 "Two O'Clock Jump" - Played by Harry James and His Music Makers.
 "Ev'ry Time" - Played by Harry James and His Music Makers.
 "Ev'ry Time" (vocal reprise) - Sung by Virginia Weidler (dubbed by Jeanne Darrell).
 "Flight of the Bumblebee" - Played by Harry James and His Music Makers.
 "The Three B's" - Sung and Danced by June Allyson, Gloria DeHaven, Nancy Walker, and Chorus with Harry James and His Music Makers.
 "I Know You by Heart" - Played by Harry James and His Music Makers.
 "My First Promise (The Ring Waltz)" - Sung by Beverly Tyler and Chorus with Harry James and His Music Makers.
 "Alive and Kickin'" - Performed by Nancy Walker and Harry James and His Music Makers, Danced by Harry James and Nancy Walker.
 "You're Lucky" - Sung by Lucille Ball (dubbed by Gloria Grafton).
 "Buckle Down, Winsocki" (reprise) - Sung by Tommy Dix and Chorus.

Box office
According to MGM records, the film earned $2,051,000 in the US and Canada, and $653,000 elsewhere, resulting in a profit of $398,000.

References

External links

 
 
 
 
 

1943 films
1943 musical comedy films
American musical comedy films
1940s English-language films
Films directed by Edward Buzzell
Films produced by Arthur Freed
Films set in schools
Metro-Goldwyn-Mayer films
Films about proms
Films based on musicals
1940s American films